District 1 is the central urban district of Ho Chi Minh City (Saigon), the largest city in Vietnam. With a total area of  the district has a population of 204,899 people as of 2010. The district is divided into 10 small subsets which are called wards (phường). District 1 contains most of the city's administrative offices, consulates, and large buildings. District 1 is the busiest district in the city with the highest living standards. Đồng Khởi street and Nguyễn Huệ boulevard in District 1 are the city's two main commercial centers. Đồng Khởi street is an area in high demand for real estate, hitting a record price of $50,000 per square meter in 2007.

History
District 1 and the other seven districts of Ho Chi Minh City were founded on May 27, 1959. Before 1975, the first district only had four small subsets (wards) which were Bến Nghé, Hòa Bình, Trần Quang Khải and Tự Đức (named after major historical characters), and the second district had seven different wards which were Bến Thành, Bùi Viện, Cầu Kho, Cầu Ông Lãnh, Huyện Sĩ, Nguyễn Cảnh Chân and Nguyễn Cư Trinh. In May 1976 the first and second districts were combined into the District 1 of today.

Administration
District 1 is subdivided into ten wards, namely Bến Nghé, Bến Thành, Cô Giang, Cầu Kho, Cầu Ông Lãnh, Đa Kao, Nguyễn Thái Bình, Nguyễn Cư Trinh, Phạm Ngũ Lão and Tân Định. Each ward has its own People's Committee, subordinate to the People's Committee of District 1.

Demographic and geographical features
District 1 has a population of 204,899 people over the total of 7,162,864 in Ho Chi Minh City.

District 1 is located towards the center of Ho Chi Minh City. The district is bordered to the north by Bình Thạnh District and Phú Nhuận District with the Thị Nghè canal as the border, District 3 to the west with Hai Bà Trưng street and Nguyễn Thị Minh Khai street as the border, Thủ Đức city to the east with the Saigon River as the border, District 5 to the southwest with Nguyễn Văn Cừ street as the border, and District 4 to the south, with the Bến Nghé canal as a border.

Economy
When Saigon was governed by South Vietnam, Air Vietnam's head office was located in District 1.

District 1 is considered the financial center of Saigon and Vietnam. It is home to the Ho Chi Minh City Stock Exchange and Vietnamese headquarters of international banks such as HSBC, ANZ, Standard Chartered, Citi, JPMorgan Chase, Bank of China, and Maybank. District 1 also known as the best spot for shopping in Vietnam, with a high concentration of shopping centres and luxury brands.

District 1 was effectively shutdown for tourism during the COVID-19 pandemic in Vietnam, causing many restaurants, bars, clubs, and hotels, to suffer major financial distress.

Consulates 
Ho Chi Minh City is Vietnam's biggest and busiest city, with a large population of immigrants from around the world living and working there. Because District 1 is the city's central district, many foreign consulates are located there.

Education
Many of the best public schools in the city are located in District 1. Vietnam's system of private schools is relatively new and is still in the developing stage.

Kindergarten

Primary School

High school

University

Office buildings
Many grade A office towers are located in District 1, HCMC.

Tourist sights

Historical sights
Buildings such as the Saigon Notre-Dame Basilica, the Saigon Opera House, the Central Post Office, the City Hall, Phạm Ngũ Lão Street, the former Republic of Vietnam President's Reunification Palace, Ho Chi Minh City Museum of Fine Arts, Hotel Majestic, Tao Dan Park, and Rex Hotel are some of the most famous historical sights in District 1. Besides these places, most streets in District 1 built and designed since 1946 were completed by the French. Most of the buildings constructed since the French colonial era are still standing, with most having been recently renovated.

Other Attractions 
The Bitexco Financial Tower is the tallest building in the city as of the beginning of 2016, and a symbol of modernity mixed with cultural influences. In addition, the Bùi Viện and Nguyễn Huệ districts are also interesting places for visitors.

Nowadays, the Landmark 81 has also become another attractions since 2018. Additionally, it has become the tallest building in the city.

References

External links 

 From A To Z Experience Ho Chi Minh City District 1

Districts of Ho Chi Minh City